Bohumil Hrabal (28 March 1914 – 3 February 1997) was a Czech writer, often named among the best Czech writers of the 20th century.

Early life 
Hrabal was born in Židenice (suburb of Brno) on 28 March 1914, in what was then the province of Moravia within Austria-Hungary, to an unmarried mother, Marie Božena Kiliánová (1894–1970). According to the organisers of a 2009 Hrabal exhibition in Brno, his biological father was probably Bohumil Blecha (1893–1970), a teacher's son a year older than Marie, who was her friend from the neighbourhood. Marie's parents opposed the idea of their daughter marrying Blecha, as he was about to serve in the Austro-Hungarian Army. World War I started four months after Hrabal's birth, and Blecha was sent to the Italian front, before being invalided out of service. Blecha's daughter, Drahomíra Blechová-Kalvodová, says her father told her when she was 18 that Hrabal was her half-brother. Bohumil and his biological father never met formally, according to Blechová-Kalvodová. Hrabal and Blechová-Kalvodová met twice; a dedication in a picture from 1994 says: "To sister Drahomíra, Hrabal!"

Hrabal was baptised Bohumil František Kilián. Until the age of three, he lived mainly with his grandparents, Kateřina Kiliánová (born Bartlová)(d. 1950) and Tomáš Kilián (died 1925), a descendant of a French soldier injured at the Battle of Austerlitz, in Brno, while his mother worked in Polná as an assistant book-keeper in the town's brewery. She worked there with her future husband, František Hrabal (1889– 1966); one František Hrabal was listed as Bohumil's godfather when he was baptised on 4 February 1914, but František was also the first name of Bohumil's future step-grandfather, a soft-drinks trader. František Hrabal, Hrabal's stepfather, was a friend of Blecha. He is a prominent character in some of Hrabal's most famous fiction work, and in Gaps, the second volume of his autobiographical trilogy, Hrabal wrote that he declined an invitation to meet his biological father and considered František Hrabal to be his father.

Marie and František married in February 1917, shortly before Bohumil's second birthday. Hrabal's half-brother, Břetislav Josef Hrabal (1916–1985), was born later that year; Břetislav, known as Slávek, is said to have been an excellent raconteur. The family moved in August 1919 to Nymburk, a town on the banks of the Elbe River, where František Hrabal became the manager of a brewery. Both Marie and František were involved in amateur dramatics, though Marie was more active. Hrabal later recalled having a complex about this, and feeling embarrassed by her being the centre of attention.

Hrabal's uncle was Bohuslav Kilián (1892–1942), a lawyer, journalist and publisher of the cultural magazines Salon and Měsíc. The latter had a German version, Der Monat, that was distributed throughout Europe, but not in Nazi Germany.

In 1920, Hrabal started primary school in Nymburk. In September 1925, he spent one year at a grammar school in Brno (now Gymnázium třída Kapitána Jaroše, later attended by Milan Kundera). He failed the first year, and later attended a technical secondary school in Nymburk. There too he struggled to concentrate on his studies, despite extra tutoring from his uncle.

Wartime activities and early adulthood
In June 1934, Hrabal left school with a certificate that said he could be considered for a place at university on a technical course. He took private classes in Latin for a year, passing the state exam in the town of Český Brod with an "adequate" grade on 3 October 1935. On 7 October, he registered at Charles University in Prague to study for a law degree. He graduated only in March 1946, as Czech universities were shut down in 1939 and remained so until the end of Nazi occupation. During the war, he worked as a railway labourer and dispatcher in Kostomlaty, near Nymburk, an experience reflected in one of his best-known works, Closely Observed Trains. He worked variously as an insurance agent (1946–47), a travelling salesman (1947–49) and a manual labourer alongside the graphic artist Vladimír Boudník in the Kladno steelworks (1949–52, and again briefly, 1953), an experience that inspired the "total realism" of texts such as Jarmilka that he was writing at the time. After a serious injury, he worked in a recycling mill in the Prague district of Libeň as a paper packer (1954–59), before working as a stagehand (1959–62) at the S. K. Neumann Theatre in Prague (today Divadlo pod Palmovkou).

Hrabal lived in the city from the late 1940s onward, for much of it (1950–73) at 24 Na Hrázi ul. in Prague - Libeň; the house was demolished in 1988. In 1956, Hrabal married Eliška Plevová (known as "Pipsi" to Hrabal, and referred to by that name in some of his works), the 30-year-old daughter of Karel Pleva, procurator and manager of a wood factory in the South Moravian town of Břeclav. In 1965, the couple bought a country cottage in Kersko, near Nymburk; the cottage became home to his numerous cats. Eliška died in 1987.

Early writing career
Hrabal began as a poet, producing a collection of lyrical poetry in 1948, entitled Ztracená ulička. It was withdrawn from circulation when the communist regime was established. In the early 1950s, Hrabal was a member of an underground literary group run by Jiří Kolář, an artist, poet, critic and central figure in Czechoslovak culture. Another member of the group was the novelist Josef Škvorecký. Hrabal produced stories for the group, but did not seek publication.

Two stories by Hrabal (Hovory lidí) appeared in 1956 as a supplement in the annual Report of the Association of Czech Bibliophiles, which had a print-run of 250. Hrabal's first book was withdrawn a week before publication, in 1959. It was eventually published in 1963, as Pearls of the Deep. In the same year, he became a professional writer. Dancing Lessons for the Advanced in Age followed in 1964 and Closely Observed Trains in 1965.

Ban from publication and later career

After the Warsaw Pact invasion of Czechoslovakia in August 1968, Hrabal was banned from publishing. In 1970, two of his books – Domácí úkoly and Poupata – were banned, after they had been printed and bound but before they were distributed. In the following years, he published several of his best known works in samizdat editions (including The Little Town Where Time Stood Still and I Served the King of England.

In 1975, Hrabal gave an interview to the publication Tvorba in which he made self-critical comments, which enabled some of his work to appear in print, albeit typically in heavily edited form. Hrabal's interlocutors were anonymous in the journal, but it was later discovered that the published interview was at least a third version of the text, and that the more explicitly ideological statements were inserted by editors Karel Sýs and Jaromír Pelc according to contemporary party doctrine. One such passage reads "...as a Czech writer I am connected to the Czech people, with its Socialist past and future".

Some young dissidents were incensed by Hrabal's actions; poet Ivan "Magor" Jirous organised an event on Kampa Island at which his books were burned, and the singer Karel Kryl called him a "whore". However, his defenders point out that an edited version of a key text, Handbook for the Apprentice Palaverer, was published alongside the interview, which ended the ban on publication and permitted his work once again to reach the broader Czechoslovak public. Ludvík Vaculík, who had published his work in samizdat and would later continue to do so, defended him, saying that the interview demonstrated that Hrabal was a writer of such standing that he could not be suppressed and the regime had had to acknowledge him. Additionally, some of his writings continued to be printed only in samizdat and as underground editions abroad, including Too Loud a Solitude which circulated in a number of samizdat editions until it was finally published officially in 1989. Hrabal avoided political engagement, and he was not a signatory of the Charter 77 civic initiative against the communist regime in 1977.

Hrabal's two best-known novels are Closely Observed Trains (1965) and I Served the King of England (1971), both of which were made into movies by the Czech director Jiří Menzel (in 1966 and 2006, respectively). Hrabal worked closely with Menzel on the script for Closely Observed Trains which won the Academy Award for Best Foreign Language Film in 1968. The two men became close friends and subsequently collaborated on other film projects, including the long-banned 1969 film Larks on a String.

Hrabal was a noted raconteur, and much of his story-telling took place in a number of pubs including, most famously, U zlatého tygra (At the Golden Tiger) on Husova Street in Prague. He met the Czech President Václav Havel, the American President Bill Clinton and the US ambassador to the UN Madeleine Albright at U zlatého tygra on 11 January 1994.

Death

Hrabal died in February 1997 after falling from a window on the fifth floor of Bulovka Hospital in Prague. Initially, there were reports that he fell while attempting to feed pigeons, though these were rejected by friends including his translator, Susanna Roth, who angrily dismissed the reports as a way of censoring Hrabal even in death. The story was later publicly renounced by professor Pavel Dungl, Bulovka's chief physician. First Roth and later Tomáš Mazal noted that suicide recurs as a theme throughout his work, and both Dungl and Mazal said that early in the morning on the day of his death, Hrabal mentioned to Dungl an "invitation" he received in his dream from a dead poet and painter, Karel Hlaváček, who was buried in a cemetery next to the hospital. Some years later, Professor Dungl said he had no doubts about Hrabal's death being a suicide. He was buried in his family's crypt in a cemetery in Hradištko near Kersko. According to his wishes, he was buried in an oak coffin marked with the inscription "Pivovar Polná" (Polná Brewery), the brewery where his mother and stepfather had met.

Style
Hrabal wrote in an expressive, highly visual style. He affected the use of long sentences; his works Dancing Lessons for the Advanced in Age (1964) and Vita Nuova (1987) consist entirely of one single sentence. Political quandaries and the accompanying moral ambiguities are recurrent themes in his works. Many of Hrabal's characters are portrayed as "wise fools" — simpletons with occasional inadvertently profound thoughts — who are also given to coarse humour, lewdness, and a determination to survive and enjoy life despite harsh circumstances they found themselves in.

Much of the impact of Hrabal's writing derives from his juxtaposition of the beauty and cruelty found in everyday life. Vivid depictions of pain human beings casually inflict on animals (as in the scene where families of mice are caught in a paper compactor) symbolise the pervasiveness of cruelty among human beings. His characterisations also can be comic, giving his prose a baroque or mediaeval tinge. He is known for his "comic, slightly surreal tales about poor workers, eccentrics, failures, and nonconformists"; his early stories are about "social misfits and happily disreputable people".

Alongside fellow satirists Jaroslav Hašek, Karel Čapek and Milan Kundera, Hrabal is often described as one of the greatest Czech writers of the 20th century. Author Ewa Mazierska compared his works to Ladislav Grosman's, in that his literary works typically contained a mixture of comedy and tragedy. His works have been translated into 27 languages.

Quotations

It's interesting how young poets think of death while old fogies think of girls. — Bohumil Hrabal in Dancing Lessons for the Advanced in Age
Bohumil Hrabal embodies as no other the fascinating Prague. He couples people's humor to baroque imagination. — Milan Kundera.
To spend our days betting on three-legged horses with beautiful names  — Bohumil Hrabal

Works

In Czech
The complete works edition of Hrabal spisy was published in the 1990s in 19 volumes by Pražská imaginace.

Selected English-language editions

Film adaptations

References

External links 

 Bohumil Hrabal - the Close Watcher of Trains, article on Hrabal by Mats Larsson (1997)
 "Bohumil Hrabal", a literary biography in London Review of Books by James Wood (2001)
 Hrabal and Prague
 
 Bohumil Hrabal at Czechoslovak book network Baila.net

1914 births
1997 deaths
Vysočany Circle
Writers from Brno
People from the Margraviate of Moravia
Czech satirists
Czech humorists
Czech male novelists
Dispatchers
20th-century Czech novelists
Charles University alumni
Recipients of Medal of Merit (Czech Republic)
Suicides by jumping in the Czech Republic
1997 suicides
Officiers of the Ordre des Arts et des Lettres